No Life for Me is a collaborative studio album by Wavves and Cloud Nothings, released in 2015.

Track listing

References

2015 albums
Cloud Nothings albums
Wavves albums
Collaborative albums